Arthur Gore defeated Herbert Roper Barrett 6–3, 6–2, 4–6, 3–6, 6–4 in the All-Comers final to win the gentlemen's singles tennis title at the 1908 Wimbledon Championships. The reigning champion Norman Brookes did not defend his title.

Draw

All comers' finals

Top half

Section 1

Section 2

Section 3

Section 4

Bottom half

Section 5

Section 6

Section 7

Section 8

References

External links

Men's Singles
Wimbledon Championship by year – Men's singles